Pat DiNizio is the third solo album by Pat DiNizio of The Smithereens, released in 2007 by East West Records. Following two solo albums that showed DiNizio moving away from the sound and style of The Smithereens to explore new musical directions, Pat DiNizio sees him return to 1960s-style pop with a big guitar sound. The album features Smithereens members Jim Babjak and Severo "The Thrilla" Jornacion on guitar and bass respectively, as well as Kurt Reil of The Grip Weeds on drums, who also handles production duties.

Six of the album's ten songs first appeared on Revolutions, a 3-disc set (2 CD/1 DVD) available through Pat DiNizio's website in a limited edition of 300 copies in 2006. "Since You Went Away", "Night Without Sleep", "I Need You" and "You Said" are exclusive to Pat DiNizio.

Critical reception

AllMusic's Mark Deming rated the album 3 stars out of 5, noting that although DiNizio "offer a few change-ups from the prototypical Smithereens approach with some spare, acoustic based numbers (such as "Night Without Sleep" and "Love") ... [other songs] are his old band in all but name". And while the gloomy "Since You Went Away" and "Sometimes" attempt to take DiNizio's songwriting into a new direction, Deming felt that "the results just don't stretch as far from established territory as they need to have an identity of their own". Deming concluded that the album "sounds less like a solo effort than a slightly misbegotten Smithereens disc, and DiNizio's back catalog demonstrates he can do better than this".

Track listing

Revolutions track listing 

Released in 2006, this 3-disc limited edition includes the same track listing on disc one and two, disc two being acoustic versions of the same songs, and in the same order, as on disc one. Disc three contains the DVD Night Without Sleep - The Making of an Album.

Personnel

Credits adapted from the album's liner notes.

Musicians
Pat DiNizio – vocals, guitar 
Jim Babjak – guitar
Severo "The Thrilla" Jornacion – bass
Kurt Reil – drums, guitar, Mellotron, vocals
Vince Grogan – bass on "Wonderful" and "Dear World"
Technical
Kurt Reil – production, engineering, mixing
Danny Clinch – cover photo
Todd Sinclair – design, art direction

References

2007 albums
East West Records albums